Lerisetron (code name F-0930-RS) is a drug which acts as an antagonist at the 5-HT3 receptor. It is a potent antiemetic and was in clinical trials for the treatment of nausea associated with cancer chemotherapy.

See also 
 5-HT3 antagonist

References 

5-HT3 antagonists
Antiemetics
Benzimidazoles
Piperazines